Butler is an unincorporated community located within the Rural Municipality of Pipestone in southwestern Manitoba, Canada.  It is located approximately 31 kilometers (19 miles) southwest of Virden, Manitoba.

See also
Pipestone Creek (Saskatchewan)

References 

Unincorporated communities in Westman Region